The 1896 University of Utah football team was an American football team that represented the University of Utah  as an independent during the 1896 college football season. Head coach C. B. Ferris led the team to a 3–2 record.

Schedule

References

University of Utah
Utah Utes football seasons
University of Utah football